The 2007 Independent Spirit Awards can refer to:
22nd Independent Spirit Awards, a ceremony held in 2007, honoring the films of 2006
23rd Independent Spirit Awards, a ceremony held in 2008, honoring the films of 2007

Independent Spirit Awards